Erja Kuivalainen (born 21 October 1964) is a Finnish cross-country skier. She competed in two events at the 1984 Winter Olympics.

Cross-country skiing results
All results are sourced from the International Ski Federation (FIS).

Olympic Games

World Championships

World Cup

Season standings

Team podiums
 2 podiums

References

External links
 

1964 births
Living people
Finnish female cross-country skiers
Olympic cross-country skiers of Finland
Cross-country skiers at the 1984 Winter Olympics
People from Ilomantsi
Sportspeople from North Karelia
20th-century Finnish women